Dictyonema darwinianum is a species of basidiolichen in the family Hygrophoraceae. It is endemic to the Galápagos Islands, where it grows as an epiphyte on the bark of branches and trunks, often closely associated with or overgrowing bryophytes and interspersed detritus. It was formally described as a new species in 2017 by Manuela Dal-Forno, Frank Bungartz, and Robert Lücking. The lichen is common and widespread on the Galápagos Islands, where it forms dark bluish-green filamentous and crust-like mats on Frullania liverworts and associated forest detritus. The specific epithet darwinianum honours Charles Darwin and the Charles Darwin Foundation.

References

darwinianum
Lichen species
Lichens described in 2017
Lichens of the Galápagos Islands
Taxa named by Robert Lücking
Basidiolichens